Mervyn Sharp Bennion  (May 5, 1887 – December 7, 1941) was a United States Navy captain who served during World War I and was killed while he was in command of battleship  during the Japanese attack on Pearl Harbor in World War II. He posthumously received the Medal of Honor for "conspicuous devotion to duty, extraordinary courage, and complete disregard of his own life."

Family background
Bennion was born in Vernon, Utah Territory on May 5, 1887. The religion of the family, which he shared, was the Church of Jesus Christ of Latter-day Saints. His Welsh grandfather, John Bennion, had immigrated to Utah with the Mormon pioneers and established successful cattle operations near Taylorsville, Utah. Bennion was living near Preston, Idaho when he received his acceptance to the United States Naval Academy. Bennion graduated third in his 1910 class from the USNA. Coincidentally, his younger brother Howard Bennion, graduated first in his class of 1912 at the United States Military Academy.

Naval career 
Subsequently, he was an ordnance and gunnery specialist serving in the Ordnance Bureau at Washington Naval Yard during World War I. Bennion's first command was the destroyer , followed by command of Destroyer Division One. He assumed command of the USS West Virginia on July 2, 1941.

Bennion was killed in action during the Japanese attack on Pearl Harbor, December 7, 1941, while in command of the battleship . He was mortally wounded by a shrapnel shard from the nearby  after she was hit by a bomb. Cook Third Class Doris Miller and several other sailors attempted to move Captain Bennion to a first aid station, but he refused to leave his post, eventually ordering his men to leave him and save themselves. Using one arm to hold his wounds closed, he died from loss of blood while still commanding his crew. Bennion was posthumously awarded the Medal of Honor.  

Bennion is buried in the Salt Lake City Cemetery.

Medal of Honor citation 
Bennion's Medal of Honor citation reads:

For conspicuous devotion to duty, extraordinary courage, and complete disregard of his own life, above and beyond the call of duty, during the attack on the Fleet in Pearl Harbor, by Japanese forces on 7 December 1941. As Commanding Officer of the USS West Virginia, after being mortally wounded, Capt. Bennion evidenced apparent concern only in fighting and saving his ship, and strongly protested against being carried from the bridge.

Other honors 
On July 4, 1943, the destroyer , named in his honor, was christened by his widow.

Portrayals 
Captain Bennion was portrayed by Peter Firth in the 2001 film, Pearl Harbor.

See also

List of Medal of Honor recipients for World War II

References

Notes

Citations

General sources
 Sherman L. Fleek, Saints of Valor: Mormon Medal of Honor Recipients, (Salt Lake City: Greg Kofford Books) 2013, chapter 2.

Attribution

1887 births
1941 deaths
Latter Day Saints from Utah
United States Navy personnel of World War I
United States Navy personnel killed in World War II
United States Navy Medal of Honor recipients
People from Tooele County, Utah
United States Naval Academy alumni
United States Navy officers
Deaths by airstrike during World War II
Burials at Salt Lake City Cemetery
Deaths by Japanese airstrikes during the attack on Pearl Harbor
World War II recipients of the Medal of Honor
Captains who went down with the ship
Latter Day Saints from Idaho